Banak Shöl Hotel is a historic hotel in the city of Lhasa, Tibet, China. It is located at 8 Beijing Road. The hotel is known for its distinctive wooden verandas. The Nam-Tso Restaurant is located inside the hotel and is popular with tourists visiting Lhasa.

External links
Lonely Planet
Wikimapia

Hotels in Tibet
Buildings and structures in Lhasa